Hubaekje or Later Baekje was one of the Later Three Kingdoms of Korea, along with Taebong and Silla. Later Baekje was a Korean dynastic kingdom founded by the disaffected Silla general Gyeon Hwon in 900, whom led the local gentry and populace that were in large Baekje descent holding onto their collective consciousness until the twilight days of Later Silla. With the former Silla general declaring the revival of the Baekje kingdom of old, the Baekje refugees from the old territories and a portion of the Rank Six Nobility from Silla seeking the opportunity of rising up the ranks gathered under his leadership. Led by the charismatic and capable Gyeon Hwon who was also a competent field commander, Later Baekje in its early days was advantageous in the power game against the newly found kingdom Goryeo and the declining Silla. However, despite its fertile territories in the Jeolla Province and capable military prowess, it eventually fell to Wang Geon's Goryeo army in 936 due to political strife and Gyeon Hwon's defection towards Goryeo. Its capital was at Jeonju, in present-day North Jeolla province.

Background

Baekje Refugees of Later Silla 
With Silla defeating the Tang Dynasty during the Silla-Tang Wars and finalizing the unification of the Three Kingdoms, an opportunity was provided for the culture of the three kingdoms to converge and for the residents to be integrated. When it came to Baekje, the vast majority of its populace including the ruling class was admitted to the polities of Silla onwards. However, Later Silla adhered to its Bone-Rank System that was highly exclusive towards the Goguryeo and Baekje refugees. In the case for those that came from Baekje, the discriminatory treatment was more severe. This was due to the fact that Baekje people resisted against Silla during its revival movement from 660 to 663. After the revival movement, Baekje refugees that were cooperative to the Silla government joined the ranks of the Nine Legions as part of the Blue and White Legion; fighting the Tang armies during the Silla-Tang Wars. Some, portion of the former royals and nobles of Baekje, were granted titles and positions by Munmu of Silla himself. However, despite these measures, there was a limit to embracing the people of Baekje by Silla when it came to fully integrating them.

Many of the former Baekje ruling class became ordinary people after the fall of Baekje. As evidenced by this, the Eight Great Families of Baekje (Korean: 대성팔족, Hanja: 大性八族) was lost to history with many of them discarding their surnames. Though some were awarded, hence granted prestigious titles by Silla, the prizes that were bestowed upon them was far lesser of the old status back in Baekje. The Baekje people and that of their descendants' political success was bound to be limited. This eventually led to the dissatisfaction of the residents of the former Baekje region and the perception that they were in fact descendants of Baekje residents as a whole; holding an antipathic attitude against the Silla and preserving their collective consciousness.

Decline of Later Silla 
After the Unification of the Three Kingdoms, Later Silla reigned as an powerhouse in the Eastern World, enjoying its heyday of more than 220 years. However, as it proceeded to decline, the local gentries across the country known as hojok began to have a desire to revolt, feeling that the central government's control over the provinces it held gradually weakened due to the endless struggle for the throne amongst the True Bone-class nobility.

In the era of Queen Jinseong (887-897), the newly crowned queen of Silla, collected taxes were not efficient due to Silla's weakened grip over its territories beyond its capital and the vicinity of it. Thus, officials were sent by the central government to urge the peasants and farmers across the country to have their taxes paid, infuriating them in the process. What came after were a series of rebellion with the Rebellion of Wonjong and Aeno in the Sabeol Province being the most famous of them. Though the rebellion led by Wonjong and Aeno (889) was put down to an end by Silla's army, it signaled the beginning of the Later Three Kingdoms period that was to severely weaken Silla in the following years.

When it began with his attack on Mujinju in 892, Gyeon Hwon's rebellion was only one among numerous rebellions which sprouted up against the weak Silla rulers in the late 9th century. Many of these rebellions were initially triggered by the Silla decision to use force to collect taxes on the peasantry in 889 (Lee, 1984, p. 98).  At this time most of the power on the peninsula was held by local gentry, who lacked strong loyalty to the central government. It was thus fairly easy for rebellions led by disaffected military officials to gain steam.

Rise to Power 
Gyeon Hwon, who was originally a military officer in Silla, was deployed in the southwest sea (South Jeolla Province) to wipe out pirates. However, his course of thinking that Silla was gradually declining resulted in his revolt in Mujinju (today's Gwangju) in 892. The Samguk-sagi records as many as 5,000 people participating in his revolt. Gyeon Hwon would march his army to occupy Mujinju and Wansanju (Jeonju). Afterwards, he ruled the area and internally referred to himself as the King of Baekje in 900. Having the country named (Later) Baekje was part of his plan to establish the state as an authentic successor to the ancient kingdom of Baekje, which dominated the southwestern part of the Korean Peninsula until it was conquered by Silla in 660. Additionally, Gyeon Hwon having the country named after the old kingdom was with the justification of solving Uija's long-cherished grudge towards Silla and inheriting the old kingdom itself. These measures were advantageous in the sense of gaining support from the Baekje refugees living in the area and rationalizing the rebellion against Silla above all else. The capital was later moved to Wansanju (now Jeonju) as well, which was closer to the central realms of old Baekje. Government offices were established in various parts of the country from this point on.

Afterwards, envoys were sent to Wuyue across the sea to establish diplomatic relations while territorial expansion policies were being implemented to subdue local gentries  and independent castellans beyond. The confrontation with Taebong, the northern counterpart of the Later Three Kingdoms founded by Gungye and the Goguryeo refugees, would begin when both states confronted each other in the Ungju province (now South Chungcheong Province).

Internal affairs 
For all but the last year of its existence, Hubaekje was ruled by Gyeon Hwon, and his personal style of rule played a key role in the kingdom's fate.

After declaring himself king, Gyeon Hwon took numerous wives, and is said to have had 10 sons by them in addition to the eight borne by his first wife.  This laid the groundwork for the strife which ended the kingdom's existence.

In 935, Gyeon Hwon chose his fourth son Geumgang over the elder sons as the crown prince of Hubaekje.  At this the eldest son, Singeom, conspiring with his brothers, had his father confined to Geumsansa in Gimje. Singeom killed Prince Geumgang and took the throne for himself.  However, Gyeon Hwon escaped to Goryeo.

Military affairs 
For much of its existence, Hubaekje was troubled by Wang Geon's naval raids in Naju region. These worked to disrupt trade and diplomatic ties with Southern Chinese kingdoms.

Hubaekje possessed considerable military strength, and Lee (1984, p. 99) writes of Gyeon Hwon that "Had Gung Ye and Wang Geon not stood in his way, he surely would have had little difficulty in toppling Silla."  Hubaekje showed its greatest strength in 927. In that year its armies attacked and pillaged the Silla capital at Gyeongju, slaying King Gyeongae and establishing King Gyeongsun as the ruler. Before the attack, Silla had sent for aid from Goryeo, and Wang Geon arrived with a large army shortly after Gyeongju was taken. The two armies met near Palgong Mountain in present-day Daegu. Wang Geon's forces in the battle reportedly numbered 10,000 men.  Hubaekje triumphed, and Wang Geon himself only escaped through the daring self-sacrifice of his general Shin Sung-gyeom and Kim Nak.

However, when the two armies met again at the Battle of Gochang near Andong in 930, Goryeo scored a decisive victory. Hubaekje was pushed back into its heartland, and there suffered a further crippling defeat at Hongseong in 934.

Diplomatic ties 
As Wang Geon sought to maintain legitimacy through diplomatic ties with northern China, Gyeon Hwon strove to do the same by maintaining ties with the rulers of southern China, particularly Wuyue. However, because Hubaekje's existence largely coincided with the turbulent Five Dynasties and Ten Kingdoms period in China, neither side was able to parlay these ties into military support.

Fall 
After he was deposed by his sons in 935 and fled to Goryeo, Gyeon Hwon himself came to lead the armies against Hubaekje. Together with Wang Geon, the Samguk Yusa reports that he led an army of 100,000 against his former kingdom.  The Goryeo and Hubaekje armies met at Seonsan, today part of Gumi in North Gyeongsang province, and the Hubaekje forces were destroyed. Hubaekje thus finally fell in 936, one year after King Gyeongsun had surrendered Silla to Wanggeon.  The battle of Seonsan thus marked the end of the Later Three Kingdoms period.

In his own characteristically open-handed style, Wang Geon conferred a title upon the defeated leader Singeom.  Singeom's younger brothers Yanggeom and Yonggeom, who were judged to have been to blame for the coup d'etat, were sent into exile.

See also 

 History of Korea

Notes

References 
 Lee, K. (1984). A new history of Korea. Trans. by E. W. Wagner & E. J. Schulz, based on Korean rev. ed. of 1976.  Seoul: Ilchogak. 

History of Korea
Former countries in Korean history
States and territories disestablished in the 930s
936 disestablishments
892 establishments
Later Three Kingdoms